Freebird Airlines Europe  is a charter airline based in Germany. It is a subsidiary of the Turkish Freebird Airlines.

History 
The airline was established in August 2018 after Freebird Airlines set up a new Air operator's certificate for a new subsidiary. They received their first aircraft on 29 January 2019.

Fleet 
As of February 2022, the Freebird Airlines fleet consists of the following aircraft:

References

External links
Official website

Airlines of Malta
Airlines established in 2018
2018 establishments in Malta
Charter airlines